This is a list of electoral results for the Electoral district of Wembley in Western Australian state elections.

Members for Wembley

Election results

Elections in the 1970s

Elections in the 1960s

References

Western Australian state electoral results by district